Amy Garcia (born 24 May 1981) is an English journalist and broadcaster. She is currently the main anchor of the BBC Yorkshire regional magazine programme Look North.

Early life
Garcia was born in Wakefield; her mother is English and her father is Spanish. She attended Kettlethorpe High School and Wakefield College. She also studied at the National Youth Music Theatre.

Career
Garcia moved to London aged 19, working on interactive TV services Chase-It.TV and ITV Play's Play DJ. She also worked on programmes for CBBC, CITV, and The Disney Channel.

Garcia joined BBC Look North as a broadcast journalist in 2009, then moving to BBC South Today in 2012. During this time, she was also a newsreader for 60 Seconds on BBC Three, before moving back to Yorkshire and re-joining BBC Look North, but as a presenter, replacing the then newly-dismissed Christa Ackroyd. She co-presented with Harry Gration until his retirement in 2020.

Personal life
Garcia married her husband Tim in 2010. They have two children, and currently reside in York.

References

External links
 

Living people
1980 births
BBC newsreaders and journalists
British reporters and correspondents
English television presenters
People from Wakefield